Dickson is a city in the U.S. state of Tennessee. Located in Dickson County. It is part of the Nashville metropolitan area. As of the 2020 census, Dickson's population was 16,058.

History
Dickson was named for Congressman William Dickson, as was Dickson County. The City started as a stop on the railroad line between Nashville and the Tennessee River. When Union Troops had finished the supply line during the Civil War, the area was known as Mile 42 post.

Geography
Dickson is located in south-central Dickson County at  (36.071485, -87.374539). It is bordered to the east by the town of Burns. U.S. Route 70 passes through the north side of the city as Henslee Drive; it leads east  to Nashville and west  to Huntingdon. I-40 leads east  to Nashville from Exit 172 and west  to Jackson.

The city center sits on the Tennessee Valley Divide, with the southwest side of the city draining via the East Piney River to the Piney River, then to the Duck River, and then to the Tennessee River, while the northeast side drains via Turnbull Creek or Jones Creek to the Harpeth River and thence to the Cumberland River.

Climate

Demographics

2020 census

As of the 2020 United States census, there were 16,058 people, 5,842 households, and 3,690 families residing in the city.

2000 census
As of the census of 2000, there were 12,244 people, 4,934 households, and 3,300 families residing in the city. There were 24,325 people in the 37055 zip code. The population density was 743.4 people per square mile (287.0/km2). There were 5,280 housing units at an average density of 320.6 per square mile (123.8/km2). The racial makeup of the city was 87.86% White, 8.83% African American, 0.46% Native American, 0.56% Asian, 0.77% from other races, and 1.54% from two or more races. Hispanic or Latino of any race were 1.94% of the population.

There were 4,934 households, out of which 34.2% had children under the age of 18 living with them, 46.5% were married couples living together, 16.8% had a female householder with no husband present, and 33.1% were non-families. 29.1% of all households were made up of individuals, and 11.6% had someone living alone who was 65 years of age or older. The average household size was 2.42 and the average family size was 2.97.

In the city the population was spread out, with 27.2% under the age of 18, 9.0% from 18 to 24, 28.9% from 25 to 44, 20.6% from 45 to 64, and 14.4% who were 65 years of age or older. The median age was 35 years. For every 100 females, there were 86.7 males. For every 100 females age 18 and over, there were 79.8 males.

The median income for a household in the city was $34,549, and the median income for a family was $42,632. Males had a median income of $32,733 versus $23,138 for females. The per capita income for the city was $17,654. About 12.6% of families and 15.3% of the population were below the poverty line, including 19.3% of those under age 18 and 14.2% of those age 65 or over.

Government

Mayor
The City of Dickson is governed by a mayor and City Council. Mayor Don Weiss, Jr., has served in office since 1993, making him the longest-serving mayor of Dickson.

City Council
The City of Dickson is divided into four wards, each of which elects two members to the City Council. Councillors are elected to staggered four-year terms, with one councillor from each ward being elected every two years.

City Administrator
As the Mayor of Dickson is only a part-time job, a City Administrator is also appointed to oversee the day-to-day operations of the city government and its budget.

Parks and Recreation
The City of Dickson Parks and Recreation Department maintains and operates various green spaces in Dickson, including sports areas, playgrounds, lake areas, and community centers.

Media

Television
 WDHC-LD Channel 6 (The Family Channel)

Radio

AM
 WDKN 1260 AM, Country, Gospel, Talk

FM
 WLTD-LP 103.9 FM 3ABN Radio, Religious
 WNRZ 91.5 FM Bott Radio Network

Notable people
 Frank G. Clement, Governor of Tennessee
 Francis Craig, songwriter, bandleader
 Trevor Daniel, American Football punter for the Tennessee Titans of the National Football League
 Walter S. Davis, educator.
 John Mitchell, baseball player
 Craig Morgan, country singer
 Anson Mount, actor
 Sunita Mani, Indian-American actress
 Anthony Wayne Van Leer, entrepreneur

See also

 List of cities in Tennessee

References

External links

 
 City charter (Archived on March 4, 2016 at the Wayback Machine)

Cities in Tennessee
Cities in Dickson County, Tennessee
Cities in Nashville metropolitan area